Thyrioclostera is a genus of moths of the family Apatelodidae which was erected in 1929 by Max Wilhelm Karl Draudt. It is monotypic, having a single species, Thyrioclostera trespuntada originally described as Callopistria trespuntada by Paul Dognin in 1894, and which is known from  Ecuador and Peru.

References

 

Apatelodidae
Monotypic moth genera
Taxa named by Max Wilhelm Karl Draudt